Orthonevra parva (Shannon,1916) the Copper-striped Mucksucker is a rare species of syrphid fly. It has been observed in the Western United States.  Hoverflies get their names from the ability to remain nearly motionless while in flight. The  adults are also known as flower flies, for they are commonly found around and on flowers from which they get both energy-giving nectar and protein rich pollen. Larvae for this genus are of the rat-tailed type. O. parva larvae have not been described.

References

Insects described in 1916
Diptera of North America
Taxa named by Raymond Corbett Shannon
Hoverflies of North America